Craigen is a surname. Notable people with the surname include:

James Craigen (born 1991), English footballer
James Craigen (born 1938), Scottish politician
Jessie Craigen, working class suffrage speaker
Maida Craigen (1861–1942), American actress and clubwoman